Ruth Florence Namie is an American psychologist known for raising awareness of workplace bullying. Along with her husband, Gary Namie, she founded the Workplace Bullying Institute in 1997. Since the late 1990s, Ruth and Gary Namie have educated the public about workplace bullying, forming the Campaign Against Workplace Bullying, launching the "Bullybusters" website in January 1998, and organizing and hosting "Workplace Bullying 2000," the first United States-based conference on workplace bullying.

Education 
Namie received a Ph.D. in Clinical Psychology from the California School of Professional Psychology in 1993. Her dissertation was titled "Antecedent familial factors and extent of adult alcoholism."

Career 
Namie and her husband founded the Workplace Bullying Institute in 1997. The Workplace Bullying Institute strives to prevent and correct abusive conduct at work through support and research. Namie assists in the development and consulting of the programs for Workplace Bullying Institute. In recent years, she has decreased her responsibilities at the Institute due to her health. Her WBI Workplace Bullying University courses are the only comprehensive training program for professionals in the world.

The Namies' efforts to educate the public about workplace bullying have been noted by legal scholars. According to David C. Yamada, a Professor of Law and the Director of the New Workplace Institute at Suffolk University, the Namies "would bring workplace bullying into the vocabulary of American employment relations...They decided that an American campaign of research and education was necessary to expose this widespread for of common mistreatment at work, and they chose to use the term bullying because they believed it would resonate with the public."

Ruth and Gary Namie have been influential in legal efforts to recognize the deleterious impact of workplace bullying. The Namies introduced the Healthy Workplace Bill to state legislators in California. In 2003, the California Assembly was the first legislative body in the United States to consider workplace bullying legislation. As of November 2022, 31 states have introduced legislation to support anti-bullying in the workplace. Only Puerto Rico, however, has passed the Healthy Workplace Bill.

Before focusing on workplace bullying, Namie worked as a training director for Sheraton Hotels in Hawaii. After graduate school, Namie worked at a health maintenance organization in California, where she specialized in chemical dependency treatment. While working at the health maintenance organization, Namie experienced workplace bullying from her supervisor. This experience resulted in post-traumatic stress disorder (PTSD). It also compelled Namie to the career change that led to founding the Workplace Bullying Institute.

Selected publications 
Bully Proof Yourself At Work: Personal Strategies to Recognize and Stop the Hurt from Harassment (1999)
The Bully at Work: What Your Can Do to Stop the Hurt and Reclaim Your Dignity on the Job (2000)
The Bully-Free Workplace: Stop Jerks, Weasels, and Snakes From Killing Your Organization (2013)

Personal life 
Ruth Namie and her husband, Gary, married in 1983.

References 

Academics and writers on bullying
Living people
Workplace bullying
American women psychologists
Year of birth missing (living people)
American clinical psychologists